Esther Sleepe (1725-1762), was an English businessperson.

She was born to Richard Sleepe, Head of the City Waits (d.1758) and the fan maker Esther Dubois (1693-1773), and the sister of Mary Sleepe Samson and Martha Sleepe.
In 1749 she married the musician Charles Burney and became the mother of Charles Burney and Fanny Burney.

From 1747, the Sleepe sisters managed their own workshop, the The Golden Fan & Seven Stars in London, where they manufactured and sold fans and other luxury items. They were very successful. After her marriage, Esther Sleepe was the one supporting her family financially, since the profession of her spouse was poorly paid, but this fact was hidden after her generation, since the Burney family had an ambition to be seen as upper class, where it was not seen as proper for a lady to be professionally active.

One of her business cards are preserved at the British Museum:
"Esther Sleepe...Makes, Mounts and Sells all Sorts of India and English Fans with great Variety of French & English Necklaces, Drops & Earrings after the most modern Taste. Wholesale and Retail at reasonable Rates. NB. Fans mended after the neatest Manner."

She was one of the successful 18th-century London businesswomen portrayed in the exhibition ‘City Women in the 18th Century’ in London 21 September – 18 October 2019.

References

1725 births
1762 deaths
18th-century English businesspeople
Ventilation fans
18th-century English businesswomen